PicoScope may refer to:
PicoScope (software), A PC software for capturing signals of Pico Technology oscilloscopes for electronic engineers
PicoScope series of PC-based oscilloscopes
PicoScope Advanced Automotive Diagnostics Kit, for automotive engineers